Andrea Iannone
  Tomoko Igata
  Dennis Ireland 
  Fumio Ito
  Shinichi Itoh
  Bill Ivy

 I